Joe O'Brien is an Irish cyclist. He won the Rás Tailteann in 1959, cycling with the National Cycling Club of Dublin.

References

Irish male cyclists
Rás Tailteann winners
Sportspeople from County Meath